Daimion Jerome Stafford (born February 18, 1991) is a former American football safety. He played college football at Nebraska and was drafted by the Tennessee Titans in the seventh round of the 2013 NFL Draft.

Early years
Stafford attended Norco High School. He was ranked among the top 20 best overall junior college football prospects by Rivals.com and Scout.com.

Professional career

Tennessee Titans
Stafford was drafted by the Tennessee Titans in the seventh round with the 248th overall pick in the 2013 NFL Draft.

Pittsburgh Steelers
On May 30, 2017, Stafford signed with the Pittsburgh Steelers.

On July 27, 2017, the Pittsburgh Steelers placed Stafford on their reserve/did not report list after he didn't show up for training camp and was reportedly considering retirement. He was released from the reserve/did not report list on May 9, 2019.

References

External links
Nebraska Cornhuskers bio
Tennessee Titans bio

1991 births
Living people
Players of American football from Riverside, California
American football safeties
Nebraska Cornhuskers football players
Tennessee Titans players
Pittsburgh Steelers players